This is a chronological list of games in the Alien,  Predator and Alien vs. Predator science fiction horror franchises. There have been thirty-eight officially licensed video games, one trading card game, and one tabletop miniatures game released as tie-ins to the franchises.

The first video game of the Alien franchise was released in 1982 for the Atari 2600, based on the 1979 film Alien. Subsequent games were based on that film and its sequels Aliens (1986), Alien 3 (1992), and Alien Resurrection (1997). The first video game in the Predator franchise was released in 1987, the same year as the Predator film on which it was based. Subsequent Predator games were based on that film and its sequels Predator 2 (1990) and Predators (2010). The first game to cross the two franchises was Alien vs. Predator, released in September 1993 and based on an earlier comic book series. Since then the characters and storylines of the two franchises have been officially crossed over in comic books, video games, and the feature films Alien vs. Predator (2004) and Aliens vs. Predator: Requiem (2007). To date, there have been seventeen officially licensed video games released in the Alien franchise, six in the Predator franchise, and fourteen in the Alien vs. Predator franchise. These have been created by various developers and released for a variety of platforms including video game consoles, handheld game consoles, personal computers, and mobile phones. The Aliens vs. Predator Collectible Card Game published in 1997 and the Alien vs. Predator themed sets for HorrorClix released in 2006 are the only non-video games in the franchises.

The stories of the games are set in a fictional universe in which alien races and species have dangerous conflicts with humans and with each other. The games pit human, Alien, and Predator characters against one another in various fights for survival. The settings of the games vary, with most of the stories taking place far in the future. Games have been released for the following platforms; Atari 2600, Commodore 64, ZX Spectrum, Amstrad CPC, Apple IIe, MSX, Acorn Electron, Atari ST, BBC Micro, Nintendo Entertainment System, Amiga, Arcade, PC, Sega Master System, Sega Game Gear, Sega Mega Drive/Genesis, Super Nintendo Entertainment System, Game Boy, Atari Jaguar, PlayStation, Sega Saturn, Microsoft Windows, Mac OS X, Game Boy Color, PlayStation 2, Xbox, Mobile phone, PlayStation Portable, Online, PlayStation 3, Xbox 360, iPhone, iPod Touch, iPad, Mobile device, Nintendo DS, Android, Wii U, PlayStation 4, Xbox One, PlayStation Vita, Nintendo Switch, iOS, Steam, VR, and Amazon Alexa.

Video games

Titles released in the 1980s

Titles released in the 1990s

Titles released in the 2000s

Titles released in the 2010s

Titles released in the 2020s

Cancelled titles

Related titles

Card games

Board games

Role-playing game

Miniatures games

References

Alien games
Predator games
Alien, Predator and Alien vs. Predator games
Video games developed in Japan
Alien vs. Predator (franchise) games
Games
Games